Marthe Matongo (born 30 April 1933) was a Central African social worker, politician and women's rights activist. In 1964 she became the first woman elected to the National Assembly.

Biography
Matongo was born into a Gbanzili family in Bambari in April 1933. Her father Michel was a teacher and she became one of the first girls in Ubangi-Shari to earn a primary school certificate. She subsequently studied in France and became a social worker.

A member of the Movement for the Social Evolution of Black Africa (MESAN), Matongo was a candidate in the 1964 parliamentary elections. MESAN was the sole legal party and ran unopposed, resulting in Matongo becoming the first woman in the National Assembly. In the same year she was one of the founders of the Union of Central African Women, becoming its secretary general, and broadcast a radio programme Magazine of the Women. The National Assembly was subsequently dissolved in 1966 following the Saint-Sylvestre coup d'état.

References

1933 births
Possibly living people
Central African Republic social workers
Central African Republic women in politics
Movement for the Social Evolution of Black Africa politicians
Members of the National Assembly (Central African Republic)